This article contains the results of the 2006 Iranian Assembly of Experts election.

Multi-seat constituencies

Tehran

Ardabil

East Azerbaijan

Fars

Gilan

Golestan

Hamadan

Isfahan

Kerman

Kermanshah

Khuzestan

Kurdistan

Lorestan

Markazi

Mazandaran

Qazvin

Razavi Khorasan

Sistan and Baluchestan

West Azerbaijan

Single-seat constituencies

Ilam

Bushehr

Chaharmahal and Bakhtiari

South Khorasan

North Khorasan

Kohgiluyeh and Boyer-Ahmad

Yazd

Hormozgan

Qom

Semnan

Zanjan

References 

 
 
Election results in Iran